Sadia Bano Butt (born 2 March 1975) is a Pakistani former cricketer who played primarily as a right-arm medium-fast bowler. She appeared in three Test matches and 24 One Day Internationals for Pakistan between 1997 and 2004. She played domestic cricket for Sialkot.

She captained Pakistan in one One Day International, against Scotland in 2003.

References

External links
 
 

1975 births
Living people
Cricketers from Gujranwala
Pakistani women cricketers
Pakistan women Test cricketers
Pakistan women One Day International cricketers
Pakistani women cricket captains
Sialkot women cricketers